José Arconada Ramos (born 18 January 1964, in Gijón) is a retired Spanish middle-distance runner who competed primarily in the 800 metres. He represented his country at the 1992 Summer Olympics and the 1995 World Championships. He won the silver medal at the 1992 European Indoor Championships.

His personal bests in the event are 1:45.02 outdoor (Seville 1990) and 1:47.16 indoors (Genoa 1992).

Competition record

References

1964 births
Living people
Sportspeople from Gijón
Spanish male middle-distance runners
Olympic athletes of Spain
Athletes (track and field) at the 1992 Summer Olympics
World Athletics Championships athletes for Spain
Real Grupo de Cultura Covadonga sportsmen
Athletes (track and field) at the 1993 Mediterranean Games
Mediterranean Games competitors for Spain
20th-century Spanish people